Cédric Mionnet (born 8 July 1974) is a French former professional footballer who played as a forward. He most notably played for Sedan.

Personal life 
Following his retirement from football, Mionnet became responsible for the sports department of the General Council of Ardennes.

Honours 
Sedan

 Coupe de France runner-up: 1998–99

Notes

References 

1974 births
Living people
People from Montreuil, Pas-de-Calais
Sportspeople from Pas-de-Calais
French footballers
Association football forwards
Le Touquet AC players
RC Lens players
CS Sedan Ardennes players
OGC Nice players
FC Rouen players
Tours FC players
Championnat National 2 players
Championnat National players
Ligue 2 players
Ligue 1 players
French expatriate footballers
Expatriate footballers in Belgium
French expatriate sportspeople in Belgium
Footballers from Hauts-de-France